Dodge House, also known as the Claeys House, is a historic home located at Mishawaka, St. Joseph County, Indiana.  It was built about 1889, and is a -story, irregular plan, Queen Anne style brick dwelling.  It has a tower, wraparound verandah, and hipped and gable roof.

It was listed on the National Register of Historic Places in 1978.

References

Houses on the National Register of Historic Places in Indiana
Queen Anne architecture in Indiana
Houses completed in 1889
Houses in St. Joseph County, Indiana
National Register of Historic Places in St. Joseph County, Indiana
1889 establishments in Indiana